Nehemiah is the central figure of the Book of Nehemiah, which describes his work in rebuilding Jerusalem during the Second Temple period. He was governor of Persian Judea under Artaxerxes I of Persia (465–424 BC). It is in Hebrew , Nəḥemyāh, "Yah comforts".

Most scholars believe Nehemiah was a real historical figure and that the Nehemiah Memoir, a name given by scholars to certain portions of the book written in the first person, is historically reliable.

Book of Nehemiah narrative

In the 20th year of Artaxerxes I (445 or 444 BC), Nehemiah was cup-bearer to the king. Learning that the remnant of Jews in Judah were in distress and that the walls of Jerusalem were broken down, he asked the king for permission to return and rebuild the city, around 20 years after Ezra's arrival in Jerusalem in 468 BC. Artaxerxes sent him to Judah as governor of the province with a mission to rebuild, letters explaining his support for the venture, and provision for timber from the king's forest. Once there, Nehemiah defied the opposition of Judah's enemies on all sides—Samaritans, Ammonites, Arabs and Philistines—and rebuilt the walls within 52 days, from the Sheep Gate in the North, the Hananeel Tower at the North West corner, the Fish Gate in the West, the Furnaces Tower at the Temple Mount's South West corner, the Dung Gate in the South, the East Gate and the gate beneath the Golden Gate in the East.

Appearing in the Queen's presence may indicate that he was a eunuch, and in the Septuagint, the Greek translation of the Hebrew Bible, he is described as such: eunochos (eunuch), rather than oinochoos (wine-cup-bearer). If so, the attempt by his enemy Shemaiah to trick him into entering the Temple is aimed at making him break Jewish law, rather than simply hide from assassins.

He then took measures to repopulate the city and purify the Jewish community, enforcing the cancellation of debt, assisting Ezra in promulgating the law of Moses, and enforcing the divorce of Jewish men from their non-Jewish wives. 

After 12 years as governor, during which he ruled with justice and righteousness, he returned to the king in Susa. After some time in Susa he returned to Jerusalem, only to find that the people had fallen back into their evil ways. Non-Jews were permitted to conduct business inside Jerusalem on the Sabbath and to keep rooms in the Temple. Greatly angered, he purified the Temple and the priests and Levites and enforced the observance of the law of Moses.

Book of Maccabees
The Second Book of Maccabees says Nehemiah is the one who brought the holy fire for the altar back from the diaspora to Jerusalem and founded a library of the Holy Scriptures just as Judas Maccabeus did. Here, Nehemiah’s political role sets an example for the Hasmonean dynasty and becomes a role model for pious, national leadership in general. The scene of reading and explaining the Torah in Neh 8 became the model of synagogue worship. See 2 Maccabees 2:13.

Book of Sirach
Ben Sira’s hymn in praise of the fathers mentions only Nehemiah (not Ezra) after Zerubbabel and Joshua and praises him for his building activities (Sir 49:15).

In rabbinic literature
One rabbinic text, or aggadah, identifies Nehemiah as Zerubbabel, with the latter being considered an epithet and indicating that he was born in Babylon. Another oral tradition, or mishnah, records that Nehemiah was blamed for seeming to boast (Neh. v. 19 & xiii. 31), and disparage his predecessors (Neh. v. 15). This tradition asserts that his book was appended to the Book of Ezra, as a consequence, rather than being a separate book in its own right, as it is in the Christian Old Testament. Another Talmudic text, or Baba Bathra, records that Nehemiah completed the Book of Chronicles, which was said to have been written by Ezra.

In art

Samuel Taylor Coleridge commented on the dearth of a classical painting featuring Nehemiah.

Veneration 
Nehemias is venerated in Catholic Church and Orthodox Church:

 13 July – commemoration (Catholic Church),
 Sunday of the Forefathers – movable holiday on Sunday that falls between December 11-17.

See also
Governors of Yehud Medinata
Sanballat the Horonite
Tobiah (Ammonite)

References

Further reading
Barr, James. "History of Israel" in History and Ideology in the Old Testament (Oxford: Oxford University Press, 2000), 87
Holman Bible Dictionary, "Persia"
Cataldo, Jeremiah. "Memory Trauma in Ezra-Nehemiah" in David Chalcraft, ed., Methods, Theories and Imagination: Social Scientific Approaches in Biblical Studies, Sheffield:   Sheffield Phoenix Press, 2014, pp. 147–57.
Lester Grabbe. Ezra, in Eerdmans Commentary on the Bible (ed. James D. G. Dunn, John William Rogerson, Eerdmans, 2003) pp. 320–1
Pakkala, Juha. "Ezra the scribe: the development of Ezra 7–10 and Nehemiah 8" (Walter de Gruyter, 2004).  pp. 225–7
Schulte, Lucas L. My Shepherd, Though You Do Not Know Me: The Persian Royal Propaganda Model in the Nehemiah Memoir (Leuven: Peeters, 2016), 197–204.
Williamson, H. G. M. Ezra and Nehemiah (Sheffield: Sheffield Academic Press, 1987), 17
Wright, Jacob. "Rebuilding identity: the Nehemiah-memoir and its earliest readers" (Walter de Gruyter, 2004). p. 340.

External links

 "Nehemiah" in The Jewish Encyclopedia
 "The Wall that Nehemiah Built", Biblical Archaeology Review
 Israel Finkelstein. "Jerusalem in the Persian (and Early Hellenistic) Period and the Wall of Nehemiah"
 Israel Finkelstein. "Archaeology and the List of Returnees in the Books of Ezra and Nehemiah"

Biblical figures in rabbinic literature
Ezra–Nehemiah
5th-century BCE Jews
Satraps of the Achaemenid Empire
Cup-bearers
Biblical patriarchs
Book of Numbers people
Christian saints in unknown century
Roman Catholic royal saints
Eastern Orthodox royal saints
Urban planners
Israeli urban planners
Prophets of the Hebrew Bible
Christian saints from the Old Testament
Persian saints
Christian royal saints